Lend Me Your Ears is an album by flautist Jeremy Steig, bassist Eddie Gómez and drummer/percussionist Joe Chambers recorded in West Germany in 1978 and released on the German CMP label.

Reception

The AllMusic review by Ron Wynn stated "Good trio with Eddie Gomez and Joe Chambers".

Track listing
All compositions by Jeremy Steig, Eddie Gomez and Joe Chambers except where noted 
 "Testimonium" (Jeremy Steig, Eddie Gomez) − 6:53
 "The Rite of the Lynx" – 8:19
 "Ria" (Gomez) – 4:08
 "Steam Shovel" (Steig) – 3:39
 "Electric Nipple" – 6:40
 "Lend Me Your Ears" – 7:43

Personnel
Jeremy Steig – alto flute, bass flute, Mu-Tron III Mu-Tron biphase, Mu-Tron octave divider
Eddie Gómez − bass
Joe Chambers – drums, percussion

References

Jeremy Steig albums
Eddie Gómez albums
Joe Chambers albums
1978 albums
Collaborative albums